The 1994 Oklahoma Sooners football team represented the University of Oklahoma during the 1994 NCAA Division I-A football season. They played their home games at Oklahoma Memorial Stadium and competed as members of the Big Eight Conference. They were coached by sixth-year head coach Gary Gibbs, who resigned at the conclusion of the season.

Schedule

Roster

Game summaries

Texas

Stonie Clark tackled James Allen on the one-yard line on fourth down with less than 45 seconds remaining in the game.

Rankings

References

Oklahoma
Oklahoma Sooners football seasons
Oklahoma Sooners football